Judge Richardson may refer to:

Eli J. Richardson (born 1967), judge of the United States District Court for the Middle District of Tennessee
Julius N. Richardson (born 1976), judge of the United States Court of Appeals for the Fourth Circuit
Scovel Richardson (1912–1982), judge of the United States Customs Court and the United States Court of International Trade
William Adams Richardson (1821–1896), judge of the United States Court of Claims

See also
Justice Richardson (disambiguation)